Deh Now-e Fazeli (also Romanized as Deh Now-e Fāẕelī and Dehno-e Fāẕelī) is a village in Sheykh Amer Rural District, in the Chah Varz District, Lamerd County, Fars Province, Iran. At the 2006 census, its population was 183, in 44 families.

References 

Populated places in Lamerd County